Segenting (Jawi: سڬنتيڠ) is a small town in Minyak Beku, Batu Pahat District, Johor, Malaysia. It is about 8 km away from Bandar Penggaram, Batu Pahat, capital of Batu Pahat district.

This town is a favourite place for people who want a respite from their daily hustle and bustle. It is a romantic place as one can watch the sun set at the famous Lover Bridge (Jambatan Cinta), which is a jetty. Chong Long Gong Temple (Kuil Chong Long Gong) was founded in 1864, is also one of the popular tourist spot for devotees  from other states of Malaysia and Singapore.

This town is under the jurisdiction of Majlis Perbandaran Batu Pahat (MPBP).

See also 
 Batu Pahat
 Bandar Penggaram,Batu Pahat
 SMK Tinggi Batu Pahat
 Taman Setia Jaya 2
 Pura Kencana
 Taman Bukit Pasir
 Taman Flora Utama

Neighbouring towns

Towns in Johor
Batu Pahat District